Anthony or Tony Barrow may refer to:

Tony Barrow (rugby league, born 1944) of St Helens R.F.C.
Tony Barrow (rugby league, born 1971) of Swinton Lions
Tony Barrow (1936–2016), English press officer, worked with the Beatles
Sir Anthony Barrow, 7th Baronet (born 1962), of the Barrow baronets